Strange Interlude  is a 1932 American pre-Code drama film directed by Robert Z. Leonard and released by Metro-Goldwyn-Mayer. The film stars Norma Shearer and Clark Gable, and is based on the 1928 play Strange Interlude by Eugene O'Neill. It is greatly shortened from the play: the stage production lasts six hours and is sometimes performed over two evenings, while the film runs for two hours.

Plot

World War I veteran Charlie Marsden (Ralph Morgan) returns from the war, hoping to see his secret crush Nina Leeds (Norma Shearer). He arrives to find her still at odds with her father (Henry B. Walthall), who stubbornly stood in the way of her dating Gordon (Robert Young) who recently died in the war. Nina honors Gordon's memory by becoming a nurse in a war veteran's hospital. Feeling the loss of the one she loved, Nina dates many men.  Upon the later death of her father, Nina returns with Dr. Ned Darrell (Clark Gable) and Gordon's old buddy Sam Evans (Alexander Kirkland). Nina eventually marries Sam, hoping to have the life she once wanted with Gordon. After the nuptials, Sam's mother (May Robson) tells her that insanity runs in the family. Nina conceives a child by Ned, whom she secretly loves. Ned, on the other hand, deserts her and moves to Europe. When a son is born, he is named Gordon after Nina's first love. Charlie knows who the father is, but the three of them vow to keep the secret of who is Gordon's biological father.  Years pass, bringing age and frailty to the friends and one-time lovers, and death to Sam, after a happy life. 

After Gordon reaches adulthood, he announces his pending nuptials to Madeline Arnold (Maureen O'Sullivan).  During a confrontation between Gordon and Ned, Nina, cries out that Gordon has struck his father.  Gordon assumes she is speaking metaphorically and apologizes. He says that he has always known that his mother and Ned were in love, but that they denied their passion. He tells them that they must marry, now, with his blessing. Wordlessly, Nina prevents Ned from speaking the truth. Gordon leaves the room, and Nina and Ned agree that they will not marry, because despite his words, Gordon would be disappointed. They wave farewell to Gordon's plane as it carries the young people to a happy life. Nina is tottering from exhaustion, but Ned steps away, leaving her alone. Then Charlie appears, bearing an armful of wilting roses. Nina sits down, leans against him and rests her head on his shoulder, and he whispers “God bless dear old Charlie who, passed beyond desire, has all the luck at last.”

Cast (in credits order)
 Norma Shearer as Nina Leeds
 Clark Gable as Dr. Ned Darrell
 Alexander Kirkland as Sam Evans
 Ralph Morgan as Charlie Marsden
 Robert Young as Gordon Evans (as a young man)
 May Robson as Mrs. Evans
 Maureen O'Sullivan as Madeline Arnold
 Henry B. Walthall as Professor Leeds
 Mary Alden as Mary (the Leeds' maid)
 Tad Alexander as Gordon Evans (as a child)

Production notes
When MGM boss Irving Thalberg bought the movie rights to the play, he initially wanted Lynn Fontanne, who played Nina Leeds on Broadway, to play the lead, with her husband Alfred Lunt as Dr. Ned Darrell. But they were not interested in making movies, so Thalberg decided to use his wife Norma Shearer and Clark Gable instead. At first, Gable was intimidated by the story's material, but he gave it his best effort and, subsequently, received a very positive reaction from all who were involved.

Box office
According to MGM records, the film earned $957,000 in the US and Canada and $280,000 elsewhere, resulting in a profit of $90,000.

References

External links
 
 
 
 

1932 films
1932 romantic drama films
Adultery in films
American black-and-white films
American films based on plays
American romantic drama films
Films based on works by Eugene O'Neill
Films directed by Robert Z. Leonard
Films set in New England
Metro-Goldwyn-Mayer films
1930s English-language films
1930s American films